The Best of Times is an album by the New York City hardcore punk band Murphy's Law, released in 1991.

Production
The album was produced by Fishbone's John "Norwood" and Phillip "Fish" Fisher. "Ebony and Ivory" is a cover of the Paul McCartney and Stevie Wonder song.

Critical reception

The Washington Post opined that the "eclecticism does provide for more variegation than is common on hardcore punk albums, but the band is still most convincing on such high-speed, relatively unadorned rockers as Freaktown' and the title song." The Chicago Tribune noted that "a hearty horn section punctuates and adds a wallop to the guitar assault." The Deseret News noted the "muscular riff-rock approach."

Track listing
"Intro" - 1:05
"The Best of Times" - 2:23
"Big Spliff" - 2:27
"Freaktown" - 2:37
"Tight" - 2:10
"Did You Play War?" - 1:59
"Ebony and Ivory" - 3:01
"Harder Than Who" - 2:12
"Car Song" - 2:02
"Beer Bath" - 2:06
"Sock It to Me Santa" - 1:52
"1%" - 2:30
"Burnt Toast" - 1:57
"Hemp for Victory" - 0:55

References

Murphy's Law (band) albums
1991 albums
Relativity Records albums